The Palestinian Authority Government of February 2005 was a government of the Palestinian National Authority (PA) which existed from 24 February 2005 to March 2006. It was headed by Ahmed Qurei and composed of 24 ministers. The cabinet was dominated by technocrat professional appointees, nearly half of them with doctoral degrees. A large part of the Government was Fatah affiliated. The Government was approved by the Palestinian Legislative Council by a 54-12 vote, with four abstentions. It was succeeded by the Hamas-led Government of March 2006.

Background
Pursuant to the Oslo Accords, the authority of the PA Government is limited to some civil rights of the Palestinians in the West Bank Areas A and B and in the Gaza Strip, and to internal security in Area A and in Gaza.

In January 2005, Mahmoud Abbas was elected the new President, following the death of Yasser Arafat. Abbas asked the incumbent Prime Minister Ahmed Qurei to continue in his post and form a new cabinet.

In March 2005, twelve Palestinian factions agreed on the Palestinian Cairo Declaration, which besides other things proposed that Hamas and Islamic Jihad join the Palestinian Liberation Organisation.

Formation
In February 2005, News Agency WAFA published a list of members of the new government to be presented in the Palestinian Legislative Council for a vote of confidence. Fatah legislators had agreed to vote in favor of the government on 21 February. Due to repeated demands by Fatah officials and PLC members to make the new cabinet more reform-minded, however,  the vote of confidence was repeatedly delayed. It was finally passed on 24 February, after Qurei had revised the list of ministers to accommodate these demands.

The Government was approved in Parliament by a 54-12 vote, with four abstentions (at the time, the PLC had 88 seats). It was headed again by Ahmed Qurei, and composed of 24 ministers. It was a technocrats cabinet dominated by professional appointees, nearly half of them with doctoral degrees. A large part of the Government was Fatah affiliated.

Timeline 
On 15 December 2005, Qurei briefly resigned his Prime Minister post to run for a seat in the Palestinian Parliament in the January 2006 elections, but returned to office nine days later after deciding not to run.

On 26 January 2006, Qurei announced his intention to resign following the Fatah party's defeat by Hamas in the parliamentary elections. At the request of PNA President, Mahmoud Abbas, Qurei remained in office in a caretaker capacity until a successor was named.

Members of the Government 

February 2005 to March 2006

References

Palestinian National Authority governments
Cabinets disestablished in 2006
Cabinets established in 2005
2005 establishments in the Palestinian territories
2006 disestablishments in the Palestinian territories